Cento can refer to:

 The Italian word for "hundred", which is used in compound words as a designation for centuries in Italian culture: 
 Duecento (1200s) [13th century]
 Trecento (1300s) [in English, the 14th century]
 Quattrocento (1400s) [15th century]
 Cinquecento (1500s) [16th century]
 Seicento (1600s) [17th century]
 Settecento (1700s) [18th century]
 Ottocento (1800s) [19th century]
 Novecento (1900s) [20th century]
 Metodija Andonov-Čento, a World War II Macedonian partisan and politician
 Cento (poetry), a poetic technique of assembling a poem from excerpts of other authors' writings
 Centonization, a similar musical technique
 Cento, Italy
 Dobels Cento, the Olympic medalist horse
 CENTO, the Central Treaty Organization